Đumić (also transliterated Djumić) is a Serbo-Croatian surname. Notable people with the surname include:

 Božo Đumić (born 1992), Serbian professional basketballer
 Dario Đumić (born 1992), Bosnian professional footballer

Bosnian surnames
Serbian surnames
Slavic-language surnames
Patronymic surnames